Sebastian Ułamek (born 20 November 1975) is a former motorcycle speedway rider from Poland. He was a European individual Champion.

Career
Ułamek rode in the Polish leagues for his home club Włókniarz Częstochowa from 1992 until 1998 and then Gdańsk from 1999 to 2000 (the 2000 season was in the Ekstraliga). He began to establish himself as one of the leading riders and participated in his first Grand Prix series during the 1998 Speedway Grand Prix season.

He made his British league debut in 2000, when riding several times for Wolverhampton Wolves before returning to Poland to ride for Wrocław. On 12 August 2001 he won the Continental Final, which formed part of the 2002 Speedway Grand Prix Qualification. He aslso won a silver medal with Poland at the 2001 Speedway World Cup.

In 2002, in addition to his Swedish commitments he rode for Leszno and returned to Britain to ride for the King's Lynn Stars. The following season in 2003, he joined the Oxford Cheetahs and returned to his home club Częstochowa. He continued to ride in the top division of three leagues and we won the European Pairs Speedway Championship for the first time in 2006.

Ulamek rode for Swindon Robins from 2006 to 2007 and a six consecutive season with Częstochowa in 2008. He would go on to win two more European Championship pairs in 2008 and 2015. He would also win the Individual Speedway European Championship in 2010.

He rode three more times in Britain for Birmingham Brummies in 2012, Lakeside Hammers in 2013 and Leicester Lions in 2017. His last season was in 2018, when he spent the season with Kolejarz Opole in the Polish Speedway Second League.

Family
Born  in Częstochowa, Poland, Sebastian Ułamek and his wife, Marzena (wedding in 2000), have two children, a son, Dawid (b. November 2004) and a daughter, Natalia (b. 2008-09-08).

Speedway Grand Prix results

Career details

World Championships 
 Individual World Championship (Speedway Grand Prix)
 1998 - 24th place (10 points)
 1999 - 26th place (4 points)
 2000 - 28th place (6 points)
 2002 - 17th place (39 points)
 2003 - 32nd place (4 points)
 2007 - 21st place (6 points)
 2009 - 12th place (75 points)
 Individual U-21 World Championship
 1996 - 5th place (10 points)
 World Team Cup & Speedway World Cup
 1996 - 11th place (0 points in Group A as Poland B)
 2000 - 5th-6th place (4 points in Semi-Final A)
 2001 - 2nd place (13 points)
 2003 - 4th place (6 points)
 2006 - 5th place (8 points in Race-Off)

European Championships 
 Individual European Championship
 2007 -  Wiener Neustadt - 2nd place (13 points)
 2008 -  Lendava - The Final will be on 2008-08-23
 European Pairs Championship
 2006 - European Champion (14 points)
 European Club Champions' Cup
 1998 - 3rd place (11 points)
 2001 - 2nd place (14+3 points)
 2004 - European Champion (14 points)

Domestic competitions 
 Individual Polish Championship
 2001 - 3rd place
 2006 - 3rd place
 2009 - injury before the Semi-Final 2
 Polish Pairs Championship
 2006 - Polish Champion (15 points)
 Team Polish Championship
 1996 - Polish Champion
 1999 - 3rd place
 2001 - 2nd place
 2002 - 2nd place
 2003 - Polish Champion
 2004 - 3rd place
 2005 - 3rd place
 2006 - 2nd place
 British Elite League Pairs Championship
 2006 - 2nd place
 Golden Helmet
 1997 - 3rd place
 2000 - 2nd place
 2001 - 3rd place
 2006 - 2nd place
 Silver Helmet (U-21)
 1995 - 2nd place
 Mieczysław Połukard Criterium of Polish Speedway Leagues Aces
 1996 - 3rd place
 2006 - Winner

See also 
 List of Speedway Grand Prix riders
 Poland national speedway team

References 

1975 births
Living people
Polish speedway riders
European Pairs Speedway Champions
Birmingham Brummies riders
Coventry Bees riders
King's Lynn Stars riders
Lakeside Hammers riders
Oxford Cheetahs riders
Swindon Robins riders
Wolverhampton Wolves riders
Sportspeople from Częstochowa